Reginald II (1061 – 1097) was the count of Burgundy, Mâcon, Vienne and Oltingen. He was born in 1061 as the eldest son of William I, Count of Burgundy and brother to Stephen I, Count of Burgundy, his successor, as well as to Pope Callixtus II.

He succeeded to the county, aged 25, on his father's death in 1087, also gaining the County of Mâcon.

By his marriage to Regina of Oltingen, Reginald obtained the County of Oltingen. They were the parents of William II, Count of Burgundy.

The place and date of Reginald's death is uncertain, as is Reginald’s potential participation in the First Crusade. Reginald’s death is dated either to 1095, prior to the First Crusade or to circa 1102 in the Holy Land along with Reginald’s brothers Stephen I and Hugh, archbishop of Besançon.

References

Anscarids
Counts of Burgundy
Counts of Mâcon
Counts of Vienne
Counts of Oltingen
1097 deaths
Year of birth unknown
Christians of the First Crusade